Virtua Health is a non-profit healthcare system in southern New Jersey that operates a network of hospitals, surgery centers, physician practices, and more. Virtua is South Jersey's largest health care provider. The main headquarters are located in Marlton.

History
Virtua began as the West Jersey Health System in 1885 in Camden, New Jersey. In October 1998, Memorial Health Alliance and West Jersey Health System merged to create Virtua Health, the largest healthcare provider in South Jersey. Former President and CEO Richard Miller led the merger. Miller instituted the philosophies and values currently used by the company. He also adopted the widely used business strategy known as Six Sigma, making Virtua one of the first healthcare systems to use its problem-solving techniques. In 2017, Dennis Pullin assumed the role of president and CEO upon Miller's retirement. In 2018, Virtua signed an agreement to purchase Our Lady of Lourdes Medical Center in Camden and Lourdes Medical Center of Burlington County. On July 1, 2019 the two Lourdes Medical Centers joined Virtua and now operate as Virtua Our Lady of Lourdes Hospital and Virtua Willingboro Hospital. In January 2022, Virtua and Rowan University announced an academic affiliation that includes the newly named Virtua Health College of Medicine & Health Sciences of Rowan University.

Hospitals

Camden
Virtua Our Lady of Lourdes Hospital is a 325-bed destination hospital for heart care, with one of the largest programs in the Delaware Valley. It is recognized consistently by Healthgrades, most recently as among America's 50 Best Hospitals for Cardiac Surgery for 2015. Truven Health Analytics and Becker's Hospital Review each named the hospital to its list of best hospitals for cardiovascular care. The hospital in Camden is the only facility in southern New Jersey performing kidney, liver and pancreas transplants. Virtua Our Lady of Lourdes Hospital specializes in surgical services, including cardiothoracic, vascular, general, bariatric (weight-loss), gynecologic, neurologic, orthopedic and urologic. The Lourdes Regional Rehabilitation Center is the only comprehensive rehabilitation facility located within an acute care hospital in southern New Jersey. Virtua Our Lady of Lourdes Hospital is well-regarded for its community outreach, providing a variety of services for those in need, including women and children, teenagers and seniors.

Mount Holly (Memorial)

Virtua Mount Holly Hospital (formerly called Virtua Memorial) in Mount Holly has 433 beds. Most of the births that take place at Virtua happen either here or at the hospital in Voorhees. Specialty programs include a sleep center, diabetes education and treatment (including wound care), asthma management and cardiac rehabilitation.

Marlton
Virtua Marlton Hospital (Virtua West Jersey Hospital Marlton) has 188 beds. The hospital has specialty programs including arthritis management and joint replacement surgery, diabetes education and treatment, asthma management and cardiac catheterization. Formerly Garden State Community Hospital, Virtua Marlton was purchased in 1982 by what was then West Jersey Health System.

Voorhees
The Virtua Voorhees campus is located on Bowman Drive and Route 73. Opened on May 22, 2011, the campus features a “digital hospital” and an outpatient facility. The hospital consists of 370 beds, each in a private room. After the grand opening of the Voorhees hospital, the former Voorhees site was sold to Voorhees Township. Nearly 150 patients were safely transported from the former hospital to the current site by Exceptional Medical Transportation. The Virtua Voorhees Ambulatory Care Center is part of the building and opened in 2012.

The Virtua Voorhees facility originally had its location about 3 miles from the current hospital, on Carnie Blvd. and Evesham Road (CR 544) in Voorhees. The hospital was built in 1973 near surrounding farms, which are currently housing developments. This location closed in 2011. Before relocating, the Virtua Voorhees campus had 336 beds and together with the hospital in Mt. Holly, Virtua delivered more babies than at any other of the Virtua facilities.

Willingboro
Virtua Willingboro Hospital is a 173-bed community hospital specializing in surgical services, including orthopedic, vascular, general, colorectal and urologic. The hospital is well-regarded for its behavioral health, gastroenterology and wound care programs. The Lourdes Specialty Hospital, a unit for patients who require an extended hospital stay, was the first long-term acute-care hospital in southern New Jersey.

Outpatient centers

Virtua Ambulatory Surgery Center
Memorial Surgical is a licensed ambulatory surgical center on the campus of Virtua Memorial Hospital Burlington County. Outpatient surgery (also called same day surgery) is performed in the facility. The center also takes part in performance improvement studies and peer review between physicians.

Summit Surgical Center
Summit Surgical is a licensed ambulatory surgical center that relocated in the Spring of 2012 to the Health and Wellness Center attached to the Virtua Voorhees Hospital. Same day surgery is performed in the facility, which has seven operating suites and two procedure rooms. Approved by the Accreditation Association for Ambulatory Healthcare, Summit serves patients of all ages.

Camden Outpatient Health Center
Virtua Camden offers many outpatient services including the Kyle W. Will Family Health Center. Through this center, patients have access to other practices such as: dentistry, podiatry, ophthalmology, gastroenterology, cardiology and wound care. The Emergency Center is a place where patients can go when experiencing medical problems.  However, since it is not a hospital, any patient requiring further attention is transported to another facility.

Other facilities and services

Virtua William G. Rohrer Fitness Center
Opened in July 2000. Virtua's Rohrer Fitness Center has a membership-based gym. The gym offers whirlpools, saunas, and massage therapists. Aside from the gym, there are physician offices as well as a cardiac rehabilitation center and a physical therapy center.

Health and Wellness Center Washington Township
The Virtua Health and Wellness Center located in Washington Township is a medical facility with many hospital-like features. The building contains physician offices, as well as facilities for diagnostic testing and outpatient surgery. This facility opened in January 2010.

Health and Wellness Center Moorestown
Opened in 2012, The Virtua Health and Wellness Center located in Moorestown features medical offices, an urgent care center and more.  The wellness center closed in 2019. Physician offices, urgent care, and imaging remain.

Virtua for Women Primary Care & Wellness Center
In 2014, Virtua launched Virtua for Women Primary Care & Wellness Center, located at its Health & Wellness Center in Moorestown. It's led by women practitioners and features offer longer appointment times in the hopes of building rapport with their patients. The program includes primary services specifically for women and ties in integrative medicine, nutritional services, and stress management.

Joint Replacement Institute
In 2012 Virtua opened the Joint Replacement Institute (JRI) in the Virtua Voorhees Health and Wellness Center. The unit contains hybrid inpatient and outpatient rooms and specializes in short stay/same day quadriceps-sparing total knee replacements and minimally invasive hip surgery.

Health and Wellness Center Camden
In January 2019, Virtua opened the Health and Wellness Center in Camden, housing dentistry, physical therapy, family medicine, and podiatry. The Dental Center serves as a General Practice Residency, providing comprehensive care including restorations, dentures, cleanings, implants, and various periodontal and oral surgery procedures.

Virtua "Eat Well" Food Access Programs 
The Virtua Eat Well initiative furthers Virtua's mission by supporting nutrition as the foundation of a healthy lifestyle. By creating reliable and affordable sources for nutritious food, Virtua intends to create communities of wellness that demonstrate the impact a balanced diet can have on the health of an individual, a family, and entire neighborhoods. The Eat Well Mobile Farmers Market visits sites in Burlington and Camden counties year-round, increasing access to nutritious fresh produce in underserved communities. The Eat Well Food Farmacy locations in Camden and Mount Holly offer enrolled patients nutrition education, social support services, and access to free produce and nonperishables. The newest addition to Virtua’s Eat Well initiative, the Mobile Grocery Store is a year-round program that visits neighborhoods in Burlington and Camden counties that do not have easy access to healthy food options.

Emergency Medical Services

Mobile Intensive Care Unit
Virtua's mobile intensive care unit (MICU), working in conjunction with local ambulances, provides advanced life support paramedic service to South Jersey residents. The MICU also provides bikes team for special events and tactical paramedics who are specially trained to provide medical support to law enforcement agencies during special operations.

MICU History
The Virtua MICU was formed as part of the merger of the Memorial Health Alliance and West Jersey Health System, which operated the Burlington County Memorial Hospital MICU and West Jersey MICU, respectively.  Both MICUs were of the original nine pilot projects instituted in the 1970s to determine the effectiveness of paramedic services.  West Jersey MICU went in service April 14, 1977 with Medic 1 (Voorhees), Medic 2 (Berlin), and Medic 3 (Camden City).  Burlington County Memorial Hospital MICU went in service on January 10, 1978 with CARE 1, operating out of Mount Holly.

Affiliations

Virtua/GE Alliance
In early 2004, Virtua Health announced an alliance with GE Healthcare, a provider of medical imaging, point-of-care systems, healthcare services and information technology. The alliance will give Virtua early access to GE's new technologies and equipment.

Children's Hospital of Philadelphia
In 2011, The Children's Hospital of Philadelphia (CHOP) and Virtua announce they have developed a partnership that will provide pediatric services at Virtua's facilities in Mount Holly and Voorhees. As part of the partnership, CHOP-employed physicians will provide care in Virtua's inpatient pediatric units and its pediatric intensive care unit (PICU) as well as providing pediatric emergency care in its emergency departments.

Penn Medicine 
In 2015, Virtua and Penn Medicine announced a strategic alliance for the purpose of creating easier access to care by growing programs in South Jersey supported by both organizations, and by facilitating access to advanced care provided by Penn. The alliance includes programs for cancer and neuroscience.

References

External links

Healthcare in New Jersey
Non-profit organizations based in New Jersey
Evesham Township, New Jersey
Organizations established in 1998
1998 establishments in New Jersey
Hospitals in New Jersey